Moheshkhali Island is the main island of Moheshkhali Upazila, in the Cox's Bazar District of Bangladesh. There will two LNG terminals FSRU and gas pipeline created to ease Bangladesh gas shortage.

Moheshkhali is the only hilly island in Bangladesh. Combined with Kutubdia, another island smaller than itself, Moheshkhali forms the constituency  known as Cox's Bazar-2 in Bangladesh Parliament. It is an Upazila (sub-district) under Cox's Bazar District.

References

Islands of Bangladesh
Cox's Bazar District